Käsespätzle (German for "spätzle with cheese", also called Käsknöpfle in Vorarlberg and Liechtenstein or Kasspatzln in Tyrol) is a traditional dish of the German regions of Swabia, Baden and Allgäu, and also in the Austrian regions Vorarlberg and Tyrol, as well as Liechtenstein and Switzerland.

Preparation 
Hot spätzle and grated cheese such as Emmentaler or granular cheese are layered alternately and finally topped with fried onions.

Accompanying side dishes are green salads or potato salad. In Vorarlberg and also Liechtenstein  is usually served with apple sauce. Leftovers of käsespätzle can be pan-fried with butter.

Regional specialities 

In Swabia, käsespätzle are prepared with Bergkäse or Emmental cheese, optionally with both. In Vorarlberg two different cheese varieties are dominating, so in Montafon the cooks use Montafon sour cheese and in Bregenz Forest they use Bergkäse and Räßkäse, a local hard cheese.

Side dishes in Vorarlberg are butter and yellowly tarnished onion rings.

Different variations are found with Limburger, Weisslacker or Vorarlberger Bergkäse.

Variations 
Grated cheese and spätzle, freshly scraped from a board, are mixed together and are heated in a pan.

See also
 List of cheese dishes

References

Cheese dishes
Austrian cuisine
German cuisine
Swiss cuisine
Swabian cuisine
Noodle dishes